Urville-Nacqueville is a former commune in the Manche department in Normandy in north-western France. On 1 January 2017, it was merged into the new commune La Hague. It is an amalgam of two pre-existing villages, which were both heavily damaged by Allied bombardments during World War II (close to a radar station, Nacqueville was almost obliterated, and its church was dynamited by the German army in 1944).

The village was originally about 1 km inland, with only a few fishing huts on the long beach. In the beginning of the 20th century, the coastal strip was developed as a resort, along with a 'Village Normande' (totally destroyed in World War II) for tourists next to the original hamlet. Suburban infill then gave the village of Urville-Nacqueville its current footprint.

Points of interest
To the east there is the 16th-century Chateau de Nacqueville in a landscaped park. To the west there is the 16th-century Manoir du Dur Ecu (a donjon was added later for effect) built on the site of a Roman villa.
Urville-Nacqueville and its beach were the site of the last hostile British landing in August 1758, the raid on Cherbourg. English forces had previously landed in 1522 to pillage and lay waste to the area. 
The long sandy beach is bounded by a Napoleonic fort on a rocky promontory, with another Napoleonic fort and battery on the outcrops immediately above the village. Both were adapted and utilised by the Germans during World War II as part of the Atlantic Wall.

The fuel supply line of Operation Pluto, one of the many critical components of World War II's Operation Overlord, made landfall at Urville-Nacqueville.

Heraldry

See also
Communes of the Manche department

References

Urvillenacqueville